Pteleonas (Greek: Πτελεώνας), known before 1927 as Harbino (Χαρμπίνας), is a village located 16 km east/southeast of Ptolemaida, in Kozani regional unit, within the Greek region of Macedonia. It is situated at an altitude of 780 meters. The postal code is 50200, while the telephone code is +30 24630. At the 2011 census, the population was 36.

References

Populated places in Kozani (regional unit)